Mystogenes is a genus of moths belonging to the subfamily Olethreutinae of the family Tortricidae.

Description 
This genus presently only contains one species Mystogenes astatopa Meyrick, 1930 described from Mauritius that has a wingspan of 12mm.

See also
List of Tortricidae genera

References

External links
tortricidae.com

Tortricidae genera
Monotypic moth genera
Olethreutinae
Taxa named by Edward Meyrick